Vasily Pavlovich Lobanov (Васи́лий Па́влович Лоба́нов, born 2 January 1947) is a Russian composer and pianist. He has been a Duo-Partner of Sviatoslav Richter

Biography

Vasily Pavlovich Lobanov was born in Moscow. He studied piano with Heinrich Neuhaus and Lev Naumov and composition with Sergej Balassanjan and Alfred Schnittke.

Selected works

Operas

Antigone, opera after Sophocles, Op. 51 (1985–1987)
Father Sergius (Отец Сергий – Otets Sergiy), opera in one act after the story by Leo Tolstoy (1990–1995)

Oratories and cantatas

Leutnant Schmidt, oratorio, Op. 31 (1979)
God-Nightingale, cantata after Osip Mandelstam for baritone and chamber ensemble, Op. 61 (1991)

Orchestral music

Aria for violin and string orchestra (1986)
Chamber Sinfonie, Op. 92 ("Painters"), (2018)
Concerto for cello and orchestra, Op. 42 (1984–1985)
Concerto No.1 for piano and chamber orchestra, Op. 35 (1981)
Concerto for trumpet, percussion and string orchestra, Op. 70 (1997)
Concerto No.1 for viola and string orchestra, Op. 53 (1989)
Concerto No.2 for viola and string orchestra, Op. 71 (1998)
Double Concerto for clarinet, violin and chamber orchestra, Op. 65 (1995)
Sinfonietta for chamber orchestra, Op. 47 (1986)
Symphony for strings, percussion, flute and trumpet, Op. 22 (1977)

Chamber music

2 Pieces for Flute solo, Op. 24 (1978)
7 Pieces for Cello and Piano, Op. 25 (1978)
Piano Quartet, Op. 68 (1996)
Sonata for Clarinet and Piano, Op. 45 (1985)
Sonata for Flute and Piano, Op. 38 (1983)
Sonata No. 2 for Cello and Piano, Op. 54 (1989)
Sonata "In 6 Fragments" for Violin and Piano, Op. 56 (1989)
Sonata for Viola and Piano, Op. 58 (1990)
Sonata No. 2 for Piano, Op. 33; (1980)
String Quartet No. 4, Op. 49 (1987–88)
String Quartet No. 5, Op. 50 (1986–88)
String Quartet No. 6, Op. 50 (2004)
Trio for Flute, Clarinet and Bassoon, Op. 29 (1979)

External links
 
 Sikorski page
 List of works (in German)
 Chronological list of works (in English)

Russian male classical composers
Russian opera composers
Male opera composers
Moscow Conservatory alumni
1947 births
Living people
Russian classical pianists
Male classical pianists
21st-century classical pianists
21st-century Russian male musicians